Sandro Viletta (born 23 January 1986) is a Swiss former World Cup alpine ski racer and Olympic gold medalist.

From the village of La Punt Chamues-ch, near St. Moritz in the canton of Graubünden, he made his World Cup debut in November 2006 and won his first race in December 2011. Viletta competed at the 2010 Winter Olympics in Vancouver and at the World Championships in 2009, 2011 and 2013. He won the super combined at the 2014 Olympics in Sochi.

Viletta stopped competing after knee injuries in 2016, unable to defend his Olympic title, and retired in 2018.

World Cup results

Race victories
 2 wins – (1 SG, 1 SC)

Season standings

References

External links

 Sandro Viletta World Cup standings at the International Ski Federation 
 
 
 sandroviletta.ch – personal site – 
 Swiss Ski team – official site – 
 Salomon Racing.com – team – alpine skiing – Sandro Viletta

Swiss male alpine skiers
Alpine skiers at the 2010 Winter Olympics
Alpine skiers at the 2014 Winter Olympics
1986 births
Living people
Olympic alpine skiers of Switzerland
Olympic gold medalists for Switzerland
Olympic medalists in alpine skiing
Medalists at the 2014 Winter Olympics
Sportspeople from Graubünden